Consuelo Fould (22 November 1862 – 1927) was a French painter.

Fould was born in Cologne as the daughter of the actress Josephine Wilhelmine Valérie Simonin, better known under her pseudonym Gustave Haller, and politician Gustave-Eugène Fould, of the Fould family of bankers. She was adopted along with her sister, the painter Georges Achille Fould, by the Prince Stirbey.

She was a pupil of Antoine Vollon and Léon Comerre and exhibited at the Paris Salon.
Consuelo Fould married the Marquis de Grasse. She was the founder of the Museum Roybet Fould in Courbevoie. She died in Paris.

Her painting Will You Buy? was included in the 1905 book Women Painters of the World.

References

 
Consuelo Fould on artnet

1862 births
1927 deaths
Artists from Cologne
19th-century French painters
French people of Jewish descent
French women painters
19th-century French women artists
20th-century French painters
20th-century French women artists
Fould family